The northern Amazon red squirrel (Sciurus igniventris) is a squirrel species from South America. It occurs in Brazil, Colombia, Ecuador, Peru and Venezuela.

References

Sciurus
Mammals of Brazil
Mammals of Colombia
Mammals of Ecuador
Mammals of Peru
Mammals of Venezuela
Fauna of the Amazon
Fauna of northern South America
Mammals described in 1842